Albert William Stevens (March 13, 1886 – March 26, 1949) was an officer of the United States Army Air Corps, balloonist, and aerial photographer.

Biography 
He was born on March 13, 1886, in Belfast, Maine. He graduated from the University of Maine in 1909 with a master's degree in electrical engineering.

While flying over South America in 1930, Stevens took the first photograph of the Earth in a way that the horizon's curvature is visible. To photograph through haze, Stevens often employed infrared-sensitive film for long-distance aerial photography.

Accompanied by Lieutenant Charles D. McAllister of the Army Air Corps, Stevens took the first photograph of the Moon's shadow projected onto the Earth during a solar eclipse in August, 1932.

On July 29, 1934, Stevens and two other Army Air Corps officers, Major William Kepner and Captain Orvil Arson Anderson, ascended in a specially-constructed balloon and gondola named Explorer I over north-western Nebraska in an attempt to exceed the current altitude record for manned flight. However, nearing the current record height, the balloon envelope ruptured, sending the gondola plunging to earth. Fortunately, all three crew were able to eventually exit and parachute to earth before the gondola crashed into a farm field.

On November 11, 1935, Stevens, along with Captain Anderson, made a record balloon ascent from the "Stratobowl" (a natural depression) near Rapid City, South Dakota. There were 20,000 spectators, while millions of people listened to a live NBC radio broadcast.

Stevens was twice awarded the Distinguished Flying Cross – one award for each of his two famous balloon flights.

He died on March 26, 1949, in Redwood City, California.

See also 
 Flight altitude record

References

External links 
 The Explorer I crew - Major William Kepner, Captain Albert Stevens, and Captain Orvil Anderson, on July 28, 1934
 

1886 births
1949 deaths
American balloonists
People from Belfast, Maine
Photographers from California
United States Army officers